Płaczkowo may refer to the following places:
Płaczkowo, Gniezno County in Greater Poland Voivodeship (west-central Poland)
Płaczkowo, Gostyń County in Greater Poland Voivodeship (west-central Poland)
Płaczkowo, Rawicz County in Greater Poland Voivodeship (west-central Poland)